Duncan Gillis (January 3, 1883 – May 2, 1963) was a Canadian athlete who competed in the 1912 Summer Olympics. Gillis was the first to serve as Canada's flag bearer during the Olympic opening ceremonies.

Early life and career

Gillis was born in Cape Breton, Nova Scotia, and died in North Vancouver, British Columbia.

He competed for Canada in the 1912 Summer Olympics held in Stockholm, Sweden in the hammer throw where he won the silver medal with a best throw of 48.39 meters. He also participated in the discus throw event and finished 14th.

References

External links
 profile

1883 births
1963 deaths
Canadian male hammer throwers
Canadian male discus throwers
Olympic track and field athletes of Canada
Athletes (track and field) at the 1912 Summer Olympics
Olympic silver medalists for Canada
Sportspeople from Nova Scotia
Canadian people of Scottish descent
People from Cape Breton Island
Medalists at the 1912 Summer Olympics
Olympic silver medalists in athletics (track and field)